The following is the final results of the 1999 World Wrestling Championships. Men's Freestyle competition were held in Ankara, Turkey. Men's Greco-Roman competition were held in Athens, Greece and Women's competition were held in Boden, Sweden.

Medal table

Team ranking

Medal summary

Men's freestyle

Men's Greco-Roman

Women's freestyle

Participating nations

Men's freestyle
271 competitors from 53 nations participated.

 (1)
 (1)
 (5)
 (5)
 (2)
 (8)
 (6)
 (8)
 (1)
 (7)
 (8)
 (2)
 (8)
 (3)
 (3)
 (2)
 (3)
 (5)
 (8)
 (8)
 (6)
 (8)
 (8)
 (4)
 (8)
 (3)
 (1)
 (8)
 (6)
 (7)
 (2)
 (2)
 (6)
 (1)
 (5)
 (8)
 (4)
 (2)
 (8)
 (2)
 (7)
 (8)
 (7)
 (3)
 (8)
 (3)
 (4)
 (3)
 (8)
 (8)
 (8)
 (8)
 (3)

Men's Greco-Roman
280 competitors from 56 nations participated.

 (8)
 (3)
 (3)
 (7)
 (8)
 (1)
 (8)
 (8)
 (3)
 (2)
 (8)
 (1)
 (6)
 (2)
 (4)
 (6)
 (6)
 (8)
 (8)
 (8)
 (1)
 (8)
 (8)
 (5)
 (4)
 (8)
 (6)
 (6)
 (2)
 (4)
 (1)
 (3)
 (5)
 (3)
 (3)
 (4)
 (1)
 (8)
 (2)
 (7)
 (8)
 (2)
 (3)
 (8)
 (3)
 (8)
 (4)
 (2)
 (8)
 (4)
 (8)
 (8)
 (6)
 (5)
 (1)
 (5)

Women's freestyle
84 competitors from 21 nations participated.

 (2)
 (3)
 (1)
 (2)
 (6)
 (4)
 (1)
 (5)
 (4)
 (2)
 (4)
 (6)
 (1)
 (3)
 (5)
 (5)
 (6)
 (6)
 (6)
 (6)
 (6)

References
Official website (Greco-Roman)
Official website (Women)
Official website (Freestyle)
UWW Database

 
World Wrestling Championships
W
W
W
W
W
W
World 1999
1999
1990s in Ankara
October 1999 sports events in Turkey